Burestan (also Romanized as Būrestān; also known as Burustan) is a village in Zarjabad Rural District, Firuz District, Kowsar County, Ardabil Province, Iran. At the 2006 census, its population was 486, in 101 families.

References 

Tageo

Towns and villages in Kowsar County